The Coushatta Tribe of Louisiana (Coushatta: Kowassaatiha) is one of three federally recognized tribes of Koasati people. They are located in Allen and Jefferson Davis Parishes, Louisiana. The tribe hosts an annual pow wow during the second weekend in June.

Reservation
The Coushatta Indian Reservation is located on 154-acres in Allen Parish, Louisiana. Approximately 400 people lived on the reservation in the 1990s. The reservation has a tribal police department, fire department, and court house. There is also a tribal medical facility, fitness center, and event center.

Language
The Koasati language is part of the Apalachee-Alabama-Koasati branch of the Muskogean languages. An estimated 200 people spoke the language in 2000, most of whom lived in Louisiana. Historically, the language was spoken exclusively among tribal members and was never written down.

In 2007, along with McNeese State University, the tribe received a National Science Foundation (NSF) grant for documenting endangered language (DEL); this provided necessary resources to document and preserve the Koasati language.

Government

The Coushatta Tribe of Louisiana is headquartered in Elton, Louisiana. The tribe is a sovereign nation and is governed by a democratically elected five-member council. The current administration is as follows:

 Chairman: Jonathan Cernek
 Vice–Chair: Crystal Williams
 Secretary-Treasurer: Kristian Poncho
 Council Member: Kevin Sickey
 Council Member: Loretta Williams.

Economic development
The tribe owns and operates the Coushatta Casino Resort in Kinder, Louisiana. The casino is home to the Koasati Pines golf course. The casino operates 8 restaurants and 4 hotels, and is the largest casino in the state. The casino employs over 2500 local residents, and it is one of the top five largest private employer in Southwest Louisiana.

Notable tribal members 
 Santiago X, multidisplinary artist, architect

Notes

References

 Pritzker, Barry M. A Native American Encyclopedia: History, Culture, and Peoples. Oxford: Oxford University Press, 2000.

External links
 , Coushatta Tribe of Louisiana official website

Koasati
Federally recognized tribes in the United States
Native American tribes in Louisiana
American Indian reservations in Louisiana
Allen Parish, Louisiana
Jefferson Davis Parish, Louisiana